Tempziner See is a lake in the Nordwestmecklenburg district in Mecklenburg-Vorpommern, Germany. At an elevation of 17.6 m, its surface area is 1.6 km².

External links 
 

Lakes of Mecklenburg-Western Pomerania